Serik Mirbekov (born 9 June 1988) is an Uzbekistani sprint canoer.

He competed at the 2016 Summer Olympics in Rio de Janeiro, in the men's C-2 1000 metres.

References

External links
 
 

1988 births
Living people
Uzbekistani male canoeists
Olympic canoeists of Uzbekistan
Canoeists at the 2016 Summer Olympics
Asian Games gold medalists for Uzbekistan
Asian Games silver medalists for Uzbekistan
Asian Games bronze medalists for Uzbekistan
Asian Games medalists in canoeing
Canoeists at the 2006 Asian Games
Canoeists at the 2010 Asian Games
Canoeists at the 2014 Asian Games
Canoeists at the 2018 Asian Games
Medalists at the 2006 Asian Games
Medalists at the 2010 Asian Games
Medalists at the 2014 Asian Games
Medalists at the 2018 Asian Games
20th-century Uzbekistani people
21st-century Uzbekistani people